CERP may refer to

Certified Ecological Restoration Practitioner
Chemistry Education Research and Practice
Cluster of European Research Projects
Comprehensive Everglades Restoration Plan
Commander's Emergency Response Program
European Confederation of Public Relations
Commercial Engine Replacement Program